Tetrataxis is a genus of plant in family Lythraceae. The sole species is Tetrataxis salicifolia.  It is endemic to Mauritius.  Its natural habitat is subtropical or tropical dry forests.

References

 
Lythraceae genera
Monotypic Myrtales genera
Endemic flora of Mauritius
Taxonomy articles created by Polbot
Taxa named by Louis-Marie Aubert du Petit-Thouars
Taxa named by Edmond Tulasne
Taxa named by John Gilbert Baker